Budzieszowice  is a village in the administrative district of Gmina Łambinowice, within Nysa County, Opole Voivodeship, in south-western Poland.

The village has a population of 352.

References

Budzieszowice